Lucio Angulo Espinosa (born 9 April 1973 in Zaragoza, Spain) is a retired Spanish professional basketball player. He is the brother of Alberto Angulo, who played for Real Madrid, as Lucio also did. He is a 2.00 m (6 ft 6 ¾ in) tall small forward.

Pro career
Angulo won the Spanish League championship, while playing with Real Madrid, and the Spanish Cup championship, while playing with Baskonia Vitoria.

Spain national team
With the senior men's Spain national basketball team, Angulo played at the EuroBasket 2001, where Spain reached the semifinals, and finally won the bronze medal. He also played at the 2002 FIBA World Championship.

External links
Euroleague.net Profile
FIBA Profile
Spanish League Profile 

1973 births
Living people
Cáceres Ciudad del Baloncesto players
CB Lucentum Alicante players
CB Peñas Huesca players
CB Zaragoza players
Liga ACB players
Real Madrid Baloncesto players
Saski Baskonia players
Small forwards
Spanish men's basketball players
Spanish men's 3x3 basketball players
Sportspeople from Zaragoza
2002 FIBA World Championship players